Rufus Brown (born July 18, 1980) is a professional American football wide receiver/defensive back for the Arizona Rattlers in the Arena Football League. 

Brown graduated from Austin High School in El Paso, Texas. He attended Florida State University, where he played football all four years. After playing on the championship team in 1999, he was a starter for the latter two of those years, graduating in 2002 with a degree in Information management. He signed with the Washington Redskins as an undrafted free agent in 2004. After playing on the team's scout team for most of the season, he made his National Football League debut early in 2005. After that season, he was allocated to the Hamburg Sea Devils, for whom he posted fifteen tackles. In 2005, he signed with the San Jose SaberCats, where he spent the 2005 and 2006 seasons on injured reserve.

References

External links

Arizona Rattlers' player page
AFL stats

1980 births
Living people
Players of American football from San Antonio
American football wide receivers
American football defensive backs
Florida State University alumni
Washington Redskins players
Hamburg Sea Devils players
San Jose SaberCats players
Las Vegas Gladiators players
New York Dragons players
Arizona Rattlers players